Villafranca Padovana is a comune (municipality) in the Province of Padua in the Italian region Veneto, located about  west of Venice and about  northwest of Padua.

Villafranca Padovana borders the following municipalities: Campodoro, Limena, Mestrino, Padua, Piazzola sul Brenta, Rubano.

Andrea Palladio's Villa Thiene of Cicogna is located nearby.

References

Cities and towns in Veneto